Narayan Wagle is a Nepali journalist and writer. He served as the editor of Kantipur Daily, one of Nepal's largest circulating newspapers, until 2008, and was the editor of Nagarik News until 18 May  2012. Wagle won the Madan Puraskar for his novel Palpasa Cafe in 2005.

Biography 
He was born on 17 June 1968 (4 Ashadh 2025 BS) in Dharampani village (currently Bandipur Rural Municipality) in Tanahun district of Gandaki Province.

Literary career 
Palpasa Cafe is Wagle's first book, published in Nepali in 2005, and subsequently translated into English, Korean and French. It tells the story of an artist, Drishya, who goes trekking into the Nepali countryside in the midst of the Nepalese Civil War. It was a best seller and was acclaimed for bringing the realities of the Nepalese Civil War to the public in a way journalism had failed to.

Mayur Times is Wagle's second book, published in Nepali in 2010. It also has themes dealing with the Nepali Civil War but is set after the war. It is a fictional narration of how journalists are caught in the crossfire, written from the perspective of a small-town newspaper in the Terai region of Nepal. Like its predecessor, Mayur Times sold moderately in Nepal but met with mixed reviews.

Koreana Coffee Guff, his third book was published in 2019. It is a creative non-fiction book that recounts his traveling experiences in Korea. It received mixed reviews.

See also
 Krishna Dharabasi
 Sudheer Sharma

References 

Nepalese male novelists
1968 births
Living people
Madan Puraskar winners
Nepalese journalists
21st-century Nepalese male writers
Nepalese columnists
People from Tanahun District